The PEN/ESPN Award for Literary Sports Writing was awarded by the PEN America (formerly PEN American Center) to honor "a nonfiction book about sports."  The award was established in 2010 and is awarded to a title that is "biographical, investigative, historical, or analytical" in nature. Judges have included Robert Lipsyte, Tim O'Brien, and Susan Orlean. In June 2019 ESPN announced it would no longer partner with PEN. The awards have not been rebooted by PEN as of April 2021.

Presented in conjunction is the PEN/ESPN Lifetime Achievement Award for Literary Sports Writing. This award is given to an American or U.S.-based writer to honor "their body of work and long-term contributions to the field of literary sports writing." Candidates are nominated by PEN Members.

The award is one of many PEN awards sponsored by International PEN affiliates in over 145 PEN centers around the world. The PEN American Center awards have been characterized as being among the "major" American literary prizes.

Award winners

References

External links
PEN America
PEN/ESPN Award for Literary Sports Writing
PEN/ESPN Lifetime Achievement Award for Literary Sports Writing

PEN America awards
Awards established in 2010
2010 establishments in the United States
Sports writing awards